Brule, Brulé or Brûlé may refer to:

Native American
 Brulé, a branch of the Sioux tribe
 Brulé (band), a Native American World Beat

Places

Canada
 Brule, Alberta, hamlet in Alberta
 Brule, Nova Scotia, a community in Nova Scotia

United States
 Brule, Wisconsin, a town, US
 Brule (community), Wisconsin, an unincorporated community, US
 Brule, Nebraska, US
 Brule River, forming a portion of the boundary between Michigan and Wisconsin
 Brule River (Minnesota)
 Bois Brule River in Wisconsin, also known as the Brule River
 Brule County, South Dakota

People
 André Brulé (1879–1953), a French theatre and film actor
 Aurélien Brulé (b. 1979), French founder of Kalaweit Project
 Étienne Brûlé ( – ), French explorer of North America
 Gace Brulé ( – after 1213), French poet-composer
 Gilbert Brulé (born 1987), Canadian ice hockey player
 Jean-Marc Brûlé (born 1965), a French politician
 Jean-Philippe Brulé (born 1981), a field hockey player from Belgium
 Julien Brulé (1875–1920), a French archer
 Georges Brulé (1876–1961), a French modern pentathlete
 Paul Brule (born 1945), a former gridiron football player 
 Robin Brûlé (born 1974), a Canadian actress
 Steve Brûlé (born 1975), a Canadian professional ice hockey player 
 Steve Brule, a fictional character in television series Check It Out! with Dr. Steve Brule portrayed by John C. Reilly
 Tyler Brûlé (born 1968), Canadian journalist, entrepreneur and magazine publisher

See also
 Bois-Brûlés, a name most frequently associated with the French-speaking Métis of the Red River Colony in the Red River valley
 Brule Formation
 Brule Lake (disambiguation)
 Brûlée River (disambiguation)
 Crème brûlée, a French dessert
 Mont Brulé, a mountain of the Pennine Alps, located on the Swiss-Italian border
 Mont Brûlé, a mountain of the Swiss Pennine Alps, overlooking Orsières in the canton of Valais
 USS Brule, the name of two ships of the U.S. Navy